Australothis exopisso is a species of moth of the family Noctuidae. It is endemic to the Northern Territory in Australia.

External links
 Australian Faunal Directory

Heliothinae